Piero Franco Rodolfo Fassino (born 7 October 1949) is an Italian politician with the Democratic Party. He was Mayor of Turin from 2011 until 2016 and is a former national secretary of the Democrats of the Left party.

Early life and education
Fassino was born in Avigliana, Piedmont (province of Turin), in a traditional socialist family. His father Eugenio was a partisan, commander of the 41st Garibaldi Brigade, his paternal grandfather Piero has been beaten to death by the Italian Fascists in 1944 because he did not want to reveal his son's hideout, while his maternal grandfather Cesare Grisa was one of the founders of the Italian Socialist Party. He graduated in Political Sciences.

Political career

Early career
Fassino registered with the Youth Communist Federation of Turin in 1968, becoming their secretary three years later. In 1975, he was elected as Member of the City Council of the Piedmont regional capital, a position he remained in for ten years. From 1985 to 1990 he held a position as Provincial Councillor, also in Turin. He was also secretary of the provincial Italian Communist Party (PCI) federation of Turin from 1983 to 1987, when he was elected as member of the National Secretary's Office of the party, first as the Secretary's Office Coordinator, then as Responsible of Organization, during the period where the party was transformed from the PCI into the Democratic Party of the Left (PDS).

From 1991 to 1996, Fassino was International Secretary of the new party; his first election to the Chamber of Deputies (the lower house of the Italian parliament) was in 1994. Re-elected in 1996, he was appointed in 1998 as Minister for Foreign Commerce in the government headed by Massimo D'Alema. From 2000, he was Minister of Justice in the Giuliano Amato government. Candidate as vice-premier of The Olive Tree coalition in a ticket with former Rome Mayor Francesco Rutelli for the 2001 general elections in Italy won by the House of Freedoms rival coalition, he was still re-elected as a Member of Parliament.

Chairman of Democrats of the Left, 2001–2007 
In 2001, during the National Party Congress of the Democrats of the Left, Fassino was elected as secretary (a position of leader in Italian political parties). He was then re-elected in February 2005, during the party congress.

In 2003, Fassino and other high-ranking party members – including Romano Prodi, Lamberto Dini and Walter Veltroni – was accused of taking millions of pounds in backhanders when state-run Telecom Italia bought a 29% stake in Telekom Serbia in 1997. During his time in office, Fassino asserted that Il Giornale, a right-wing newspaper, published confidential wiretap transcripts shortly before the 2006 election to create the impression that he had exercised improper pressure in the attempted takeover of Banca Nazionale del Lavoro by insurer Unipol in 2005. In 2013, a court awarded 80,000 euros in damages to Fassino for the incident.

Member of Parliament, 2006–2011 
In addition to his role in parliament, Fassino was a member of Italian delegation to the Assembly of the Western European Union from 2006 until 2011, where he served as chairman of the Committee on Political Affairs and as rapporteur for the Western Balkans.

From 2007 until 2010, Fassino served as the European Union's special envoy for Myanmar, appointed by the Union’s High Representative for Common Foreign and Security Policy, Javier Solana.

Mayor of Turin, 2011–2016 
Fassino served as Mayor of Turin from 2011 until 2016. In the 2016 elections, he was defeated by Chiara Appendino, who overturned an 11-point gap after the first round to win 55 percent of the vote.

Member of Parliament, 2018–present 
Fassino has also served as member of the Italian delegation to the Parliamentary Assembly of the Council of Europe from 1994 until 1996; from 2006 until 2011; and since 2018. As member of the Democratic Party, he is part of the Socialists, Democrats and Greens Group. In the Assembly, he serves on the Committee on the Honouring of Obligations and Commitments by Member States of the Council of Europe (since 2018); the Committee on Political Affairs and Democracy (since 2018); and  the Sub-Committee on the Middle East and the Arab World (since 2019). He also serves as the Assembly's co-rapporteur on Serbia (alongside Ian Liddell-Grainger) and Libya.

Recognition
Fassino received the America Award from the Italy-USA Foundation in 2010.

Other activities
 European Council on Foreign Relations (ECFR), Member of the Council
 Italy-USA Foundation, Member (since 2018)

Personal life
Fassino is married to Anna Maria Serafini, who was elected in Italian Senate (the second chamber of the Italian parliament) in 2006. He considers himself Roman Catholic.

External links
 Fassino proclaimed mayor

References

|-

|-

|-

|-

1949 births
Living people
People from Avigliana
Italian Roman Catholics
Italian Communist Party politicians
Democratic Party of the Left politicians
Democrats of the Left politicians
Democratic Party (Italy) politicians
Italian Ministers of Justice
Government ministers of Italy
Deputies of Legislature XII of Italy
Deputies of Legislature XIII of Italy
Deputies of Legislature XIV of Italy
Deputies of Legislature XV of Italy
Deputies of Legislature XVI of Italy
Deputies of Legislature XVIII of Italy
Mayors of Turin
University of Turin alumni
Deputies of Legislature XIX of Italy